The Deutsche Höhere Privatschule (DHPS) is a bilingual private school in Namibia. Situated in the capital Windhoek, 
The DHPS also offers boarding school facilities, a kindergarten and pre-school and primary and secondary grades from Grade 1 to grade 12. Various sporting facilities are part of the spacious campus in the centre of town, e.g. swimming pool, hostel, basketball courts, soccer fields, beach volleyball field and roller hockey rink. 

History
The school was established in 1909 under the name Kaiserliche Realschule (Imperial High School). Its name changed to Deutsche Höhere Privatschule upon the abdication of the German emperor Wilhelm II. The school celebrated its 100th anniversary in 2009 with the hosting of many events during the year.  DHPS is funded by the Federal German Government as well as by school fees.

See also
 Germany–Namibia relations
 German language in Namibia
 German Namibians

References

External links

  Deutsche Höhere Privatschule Windhoek
  Deutsche Höhere Privatschule Windhoek
100 Jahre DHPS 1909 - 2009, az.com.na

German-Namibian culture
Schools in Windhoek
Boarding schools in Namibia
German international schools in Africa
Educational institutions established in 1909
1909 establishments in German South West Africa
International schools in Namibia